John Child may refer to:

 Sir John Child, 1st Baronet (died 1690), governor of Bombay
 John Child (MP) (c. 1677–1703), Member of Parliament (MP) for Devizes 1702–1703
 John Child (volleyball) (born 1967), retired Canadian beach volleyball player

See also
John Childs (disambiguation)